Wicket-keepers plays an important role in test cricket and, over time, the role has evolved into a specialist position.

In Test cricket, only 34 wicket-keepers have kept wicket in a match for Australia.

Jack Blackham was the first and longest-serving wicket-keeper who kept wicket for Australia and is considered first of the modern great wicketkeepers. He played in thirty-five Test matches between 1877 and 1894 for Australia against England in which he caught 36 catches and stumped 24. He was also the first wicket-keeper captain of the Australian cricket team.

Jack Blackham, Billy Murdoch, Barry Jarman, Adam Gilchrist, and Tim Paine are the only wicket-keepers who have captained the Australian cricket team. Paine is the longest serving wicket-keeper Test captain for Australia.

This list only includes players who have played as the designated keeper for a match. On occasions, another player may have stepped in to relieve the primary wicket-keeper due to injury or the keeper bowling.

Statistics are correct as of 18 December 2022.

See also
List of Australian Test cricketers
List of Australia ODI wicket-keepers
List of Australia T20I wicket-keepers

Notes
Blackham appeared in three further Tests as a fielder, taking two catches.
Murdoch appeared in 17 further Tests as a fielder, taking 12 catches.
Jarvis appeared in two further Tests as a fielder, taking one catch.
Burton appeared in one further Test as a fielder, taking one catch.
Phillips appeared in nine further Tests as a fielder, taking nine catches.
Wade appeared in 14 further Tests as a fielder, taking 11 catches.

References

Wicket-keepers, Test
Australian
Australian
Wicket-keepers